The FIFA World Cup, sometimes called the Football World Cup or the Soccer World Cup, but is normally referred to simply as the World Cup, is an international association football competition contested by the men's national teams of the members of Fédération Internationale de Football Association (FIFA), the sport's global governing body. The championship has been awarded every four years since the first tournament in 1930, except in 1942 and 1946, due to World War II.

The tournament consists of two parts, the qualification phase and the final phase (officially called the World Cup Finals). The qualification phase, which currently take place over the three years preceding the Finals, is used to determine which teams qualify for the Finals. The current format of the Finals involves 32 teams competing for the title, at venues within the host nation (or nations) over a period of about a month. The World Cup Finals is the most widely viewed sporting event in the world, with an estimated 715.1 million people watching the 2006 tournament final.

Trinidad and Tobago have qualified for the final stages of the FIFA World Cup on one occasion, in 2006, when they qualified for the tournament in Germany, but were eliminated at the group stage. Trinidad & Tobago was the Smallest and least populated Country to participate in a FIFA World Cup but the population record was broken by Iceland in 2018.

World Cup record

2006 FIFA World Cup

Squad

 

Silvio Spann was originally in the squad, but had to drop-out after sustaining a hamstring injury in the run-up to the tournament. He was replaced by Evans Wise.
Head coach of Trinidad and Tobago's 2006 World Cup squad was Leo Beenhakker.

Finals Matches
Trinidad and Tobago were drawn in Group B along with England, Sweden, and Paraguay.

In their first match, Trinidad and Tobago held a strong Swedish side to a 0–0 draw, despite having Avery John sent off less than 30 seconds into the second half. Team captain Dwight Yorke won Man of the Match honours.

Trinidad and Tobago lost their second game of the group stage to England 2–0. Late goals from Peter Crouch and Steven Gerrard secured England a place in the second round.
Trinidad had hoped for a draw between Paraguay and Sweden for their best chances of getting second place but Sweden defeated Paraguay 1–0.

Trinidad and Tobago lost their third and final game of Group B to Paraguay 2–0.  An own goal from Brent Sancho put them behind early in the game, and Paraguay scored a second goal late in the match from Nelson Cuevas.

Trinidad and Tobago finished last in Group B with one point, and were eliminated from the 2006 World Cup. They were the only team in the 2006 World Cup not to score a goal.

Group B

Trinidad and Tobago vs Sweden

England vs Trinidad and Tobago

Paraguay vs Trinidad and Tobago

Record players

Nine players have been fielded in all three of Trinidad and Tobago's World Cup matches in 2006, making them record World Cup players for their country.

References

External links

Trinadad and Tobago at the 2006 World Cup BBC Page

 
Countries at the FIFA World Cup